The Leeds and Liverpool Canal Society is a waterway society on the Leeds and Liverpool Canal in Lancashire and Yorkshire, England. The society was formed to help promote the canal, and to encourage greater appreciation and understanding of its history and environment.

See also
List of waterway societies in the United Kingdom
Airedale Boat Club

External links
Leeds and Liverpool Canal Society website
BBC Radio Four, Open Country, 7 October 2006, featuring Leeds and Liverpool Canal Society
Hyndburn Borough Council consultation on canal, incl. L & L Canal Society
Sefton Council listing for L & L Canal Society
British Waterways leisure website "Waterscape": listing L & L Canal Society

Waterways organisations in England
Organisations based in Lancashire